Steven Kent (born 3 January 1988 in Levin) is a New Zealand swimmer. He competed in the 4 × 200 metre freestyle relay event at the 2012 Summer Olympics.

Five years later, he competed at the 2017 World Games winning a bronze medal in lifesaving.

He represented New Zealand in Surf Life Saving at the 2008, 2010, 2012, 2014, 2016, 2018 & 2022 World Lifesaving Championships. Winning in 2012, 2014 and 2016. He was captain on the team in 2018 and 2022.

Kent's older brother Dean was also a New Zealand Olympic representative swimmer.

References

External links
 
 

1988 births
Living people
New Zealand male swimmers
Olympic swimmers of New Zealand
Swimmers at the 2012 Summer Olympics
Swimmers at the 2014 Commonwealth Games
World Games bronze medalists
Competitors at the 2017 World Games
New Zealand lifesaving athletes
Commonwealth Games competitors for New Zealand
21st-century New Zealand people